Joe Ainsworth is an English screenwriter. He has written 150+ episodes of the British soap opera Brookside.

Career
He has also written for The Lakes, Mayo, Merseybeat and Holby City. His episode of Holby City, titled "Past Imperfect" won a BAFTA award for best continuing drama.  He was part of the regular writing team on Holby City from 2004 to 2022 and has contributed 75 scripts making him the serials most prolific writer. In 2020, Hurricane Films announced it was developing The Last Bus and The Last Date, written by Ainsworth.

Honours
Ainsworth studied English at Edge Hill University from 1986, graduating in 1989. There is a Halls of Residence called Ainsworth in his honour.

References

External links
 

Living people
English screenwriters
English male screenwriters
British soap opera writers
People educated at St Mary's College, Crosby
British male television writers
Year of birth missing (living people)